Edvinas Dautartas (born 28 August 1987 in Raudondvaris, Lithuania) is a swimmer from Lithuania. He participated in the 2004, and 2008 Summer Olympics. National records holder.

Dautartas represented Lithuania in 2010 European Short Course Swimming Championships, where he reached final in 200 m breaststroke.

References

1987 births
Living people
Lithuanian male breaststroke swimmers
Olympic swimmers of Lithuania
Swimmers at the 2004 Summer Olympics
Swimmers at the 2008 Summer Olympics